Sourav K (born 27 May 2001) is an indian professional footballer who plays as a winger for I-League club Gokulam Kerala.

Club career
Gokulam Kerala

On 30 August 2021, Sourav joined I-League club Gokulam Kerala on a two-year contract.

Career statistics

Club

Honours
'''Gokulam Kerala
 I-League: 2021–22

References

Indian footballers
Footballers from Kerala
I-League players
Gokulam Kerala FC players
2001 births
Living people